The Last Posse is a 1953 American Western film directed by Alfred L. Werker and starring Broderick Crawford, John Derek, Charles Bickford and Wanda Hendrix.

Plot
When the anxiously awaited posse returns with neither prisoners nor the stolen money, we learn through flashbacks from three different characters, what took place. Having been cheated by Sampson Drune, a father and his two sons have robbed him and fled. A posse led by Drune took off after them and although unwanted, the town's drunken Sheriff joined them. The Sheriff's influence on Jed, the adopted son of Drune, is the key to Jed later revealing who killed Drune, the robbers, and what happened to the money.

Cast
 Broderick Crawford as Sheriff John Frazier
 John Derek as Jed Clayton
 Charles Bickford as Sampson Drune
 Wanda Hendrix as Deborah
 Warner Anderson as Robert Emerson
 Henry Hull as Ollie Stokely
 Will Wright as Todd Mitchell
 Tom Powers as Frank White
 Raymond Greenleaf as Arthur Hagan
 James Kirkwood as Judge Parker
 Eddy Waller as Dr. Pryor
 Skip Homeier as Art Romer
 James Bell as Will Romer
 Guy Wilkerson as George Romer

References

External links
 
 
 

1953 films
American Western (genre) films
1953 Western (genre) films
American black-and-white films
Films directed by Alfred L. Werker
1950s English-language films
1950s American films